The Terengganu Hanelang enters a club in Malaysian football competitions to represent the district of Hulu Terengganu. The team's homebase is located at Tasik Kenyir. They recently played in the third-tier division in Malaysian football, the Malaysia FAM League.

History
Terengganu Hanelang were first established in 2014 by Terengganu Football Association as the third team from Terengganu to compete in the Malaysia football league after Terengganu F.A. and T-Team F.C. The team were registered for the 2014 Malaysia FAM League under the administration of Persatuan Bolasepak Daerah Hulu Terengganu, and use the name Terengganu Hanelang.

Throughout their existence, and as of 2018, the team played in the Malaysia FAM League. They withdraw from the FAM League on 20 July 2018, due to financial problems, and as a result their results for that season was expunged.

Stadium
The team's home stadium is Padang Astaka Kuala Berang, an open field with 1000 capacity grandstand, in Kuala Berang. They also have played in Sultan Ismail Nasiruddin Shah Stadium and Sultan Mizan Zainal Abidin Stadium, both in Kuala Terengganu.

Kit manufacturer and shirt sponsor

Current squad
As of 19 February 2018

Management team

Club personnel

Team managers

Coaches

Achievement

See also
 Terengganu
 T-Team FC
 Terengganu City

References

External links
 Official Facebook Page

Malaysia FAM League clubs
Football clubs in Malaysia